T8M-900M is a tram serving the tram system of Sofia, Bulgaria. The trams were made between 1999 and 2001 by Tramkar as a renovation of the older T8M-900 trams. They have 3 sections (the second is low-floor) and they can carry up to 300 passengers. Their maximum speed is 60 km/h. They are orange with a white line on the bottom. The power of their two motors is 200 kW. They move on  gauge track (narrow gauge) and can accelerate extremely fast for trams, faster than the newest, modern trams. One very good thing for these trams is that they are very light. A tram is about 30 tons. That is with 10 tons lighter than the new, modern ones. They are symbols of Sofia and her appearance.

Vehicles introduced in 1991

Tram vehicles of Bulgaria
Tramkar trams
Transport in Sofia